Richard Baltzer (Danzig, 1 June 1886  – Prague, 10 May 1945) was a German Lieutenant general during World War II who commanded several divisions.

Biography 

In the summer of 1939, during the mobilization for World War II, he was appointed commander of the 217th Infantry Division, which he led during the Invasion of Poland. 
On 1 October 1939, he was promoted to lieutenant general. After the Polish campaign, the division was initially used as an occupation force in Poland. In the summer of 1940, the division was transferred to France also as an occupation force. 

At the beginning of summer 1941 he led his Division in Operation Barbarossa in the attack on northern Russia. On 31 January 1942 he was awarded the German Cross in Gold. On 15 April 1942, he was relieved of command and transferred to the Führer reserve. 
On 15 August 1942 he was appointed commander of the 156th Reserve Division, which guarded the French coast. In December 1943 he was transferred again to the Führer reserve. On 25 March 1944 he was appointed commander of the 182nd Reserve Division,  which was renamed into 182nd Infantry Division on 1 March 1945. He fought with this Division in France and later in Slovakia.

On 10 May 1945, after the surrender of the Wehrmacht, he was killed in Prague in circumstances that remain unknown.

References
Lexikon der-Wehrmacht

1886 births
1945 deaths
Lieutenant generals of the German Army (Wehrmacht)
German Army personnel of World War I
Recipients of the Gold German Cross